A Espia is a Portuguese historical drama television miniseries starring Daniela Ruah, Diogo Morgado and Maria João Bastos. It originally aired in 2020 on RTP1.

Premise 
The fiction, taking place in between Lisbon, Porto and Galicia, starts in 1941, during World War II. It tracks the maze of espionage in 1940s Portugal by focusing on the Shell network, dealing with developments such as the provision of tungsten (a critical mineral in war time).

Cast

Production and release 
Produced by Ukbar Filmes together with RTP, Ficción Producciones and with the support from ICA and PIC Portugal, it is a joint co-production by Portugal and Spain. Developed by José de Pina and Rui Cardoso Martins based on an original idea from Pandora da Cunha Telles, the writing team was formed by Raquel Palermo, Cláudia Clemente, Martim Baginha, Snir Wein, Pablo Iraola, Pandora da Cunha Telles, Rui Cardoso Martins and José de Pina.

Consisting of 8 episodes, shooting took place from May to July 2019 in Lisbon, Porto, Curia, Tomar, Figueira da Foz and Santiago de Compostela.

Directors included , Edgar Pêra and João Maia.
Historian Margarida de Magalhães Ramalho worked as historical advisor.

Awards and nominations 

|-
| align = "center" | 2021 || 10th Sophia Awards || colspan = "2" | Best Series or TV Movie ||  || 
|}

References 

2020s Portuguese television series
2020 Portuguese television series debuts
2020 Portuguese television series endings
Television shows set in Portugal
Television shows set in Galicia (Spain)
Television shows filmed in Portugal
Television shows filmed in Spain
Television series set in 1941
Portuguese-language television shows
Spy thriller television series
Portuguese drama television series
Rádio e Televisão de Portugal original programming